Maksim Drobysh (born 30 January 2001) is a Belarusian footballer, who plays for Vitebsk.

References

External links

2001 births
Living people
Sportspeople from Vitebsk
Belarusian footballers
Association football midfielders
FC Vitebsk players